The Waldorf Playing Fields are three fields adjacent to Matley Lane in Hyde, Tameside.

History

The playing field was donated to the people of the Borough of Hyde for recreation by Newton Mill Ltd. in 1973, but had a covenant restricting their use as a "recreation ground for the use of the residents of Hyde".

The Borough of Hyde was incorporated into the Metropolitan Borough of Tameside on 1 April 1974 under the Local Government Act 1972. In 1986 Tameside became a unitary authority with the abolition of the Greater Manchester County Council.

The fields are currently subject to a dispute regarding their future use. Tameside Council is proposing the sale of two of the fields, subject to the lifting of the covenant. There is a local group campaigning to retain the fields for public use.

References

External links
 Waldorf Playing Fields Protection Group

Geography of Tameside
Hyde, Greater Manchester